John Watson House may refer to:

John Watson House (Hiram, Maine), listed on the National Register of Historic Places (NRHP) in Oxford County
John Watson House (Warrenton, North Carolina), NRHP-listed
John N. and Cornelia Watson House, Lakeview, Oregon, NRHP-listed

See also
Watson House (disambiguation)